Sigrid Undset (20 May 1882 – 10 June 1949) was a Norwegian-Danish novelist who was awarded the Nobel Prize for Literature in 1928.

Undset was born in Kalundborg, Denmark, but her family moved to Norway when she was two years old. In 1924, she converted to Catholicism. She fled Norway for the United States in 1940 because of her opposition to Nazi Germany and the German invasion and occupation of Norway, but returned after World War II ended in 1945.

Her best-known work is Kristin Lavransdatter, a trilogy about life in Norway in the Middle Ages, portrayed through the experiences of a woman from birth until death. Its three volumes were published between 1920 and 1922.

Early life

Sigrid Undset was born on 20 May 1882 in the small town of Kalundborg, Denmark, at the childhood home of her mother, Charlotte Undset (1855–1939, née Anna Maria Charlotte Gyth). Undset was the eldest of three daughters. She and her family moved to Norway when she was two.

She grew up in the Norwegian capital, Oslo (or Kristiania, as it was known until 1925). When she was only 11 years old, her father, the Norwegian archaeologist Ingvald Martin Undset (1853–1893), died at the age of 40 after a long illness.

The family's economic situation meant that Undset had to give up hope of a university education and after a one-year secretarial course she obtained work at the age of 16 as a secretary with an engineering company in Kristiania, a post she was to hold for 10 years.

She joined the Norwegian Authors' Union in 1907 and from 1933 through 1935 headed its Literary Council, eventually serving as the union's chairwoman from 1936 until 1940.

Writer

While employed at office work, Undset wrote and studied. She was 16 years old when she made her first attempt at writing a novel set in the Nordic Middle Ages. The manuscript, a historical novel set in medieval Denmark, was ready by the time she was 22. It was turned down by the publishing house.

Nonetheless, two years later, she completed another manuscript, much less voluminous than the first at only 80 pages. She had put aside the Middle Ages and had instead produced a realistic description of a woman with a middle-class background in contemporary Kristiania. This book was also refused by the publishers at first but it was subsequently accepted. The title was Fru Marta Oulie, and the opening sentence (the words of the book's main character) scandalised readers: "I have been unfaithful to my husband".

Thus, at the age of 25, Undset made her literary debut with a short realistic novel on adultery, set against a contemporary background. It created a stir, and she found herself ranked as a promising young author in Norway. During the years up to 1919, Undset published a number of novels set in contemporary Kristiania. Her contemporary novels of the period 1907–1918 are about the city and its inhabitants. They are stories of working people, of trivial family destinies, of the relationship between parents and children. Her main subjects are women and their love. Or, as she herself put it—in her typically curt and ironic manner—"the immoral kind" (of love).

This realistic period culminated in the novels Jenny (1911) and Vaaren (Spring) (1914). The first is about a woman painter who, as a result of romantic crises, believes that she is wasting her life, and, in the end, commits suicide. The other tells of a woman who succeeds in saving both herself and her love from a serious matrimonial crisis, finally creating a secure family. These books placed Undset apart from the incipient women's emancipation movement in Europe.

Undset's books sold well from the start, and, after the publication of her third book, she left her office job and prepared to live on her income as a writer. Having been granted a writer's scholarship, she set out on a lengthy journey in Europe. After short stops in Denmark and Germany, she continued to Italy, arriving in Rome in December 1909, where she remained for nine months. Undset's parents had had a close relationship with Rome, and, during her stay there, she followed in their footsteps. The encounter with Southern Europe meant a great deal to her; she made friends within the circle of Scandinavian artists and writers in Rome.

Marriage and children
In Rome, Undset met Anders Castus Svarstad, a Norwegian painter, whom she married almost three years later. She was 30; Svarstad was thirteen years older, married, and had a wife and three children in Norway. It was nearly three years before Svarstad got his divorce from his first wife.

Undset and Svarstad were married in 1912 and went to stay in London for six months. From London, they returned to Rome, where their first child was born in January 1913. A boy, he was named after his father. In the years up to 1919, she had another child, and the household also took in Svarstad's three children from his first marriage. These were difficult years: her second child, a girl, was mentally handicapped, as was one of Svarstad's sons by his first wife.

She continued writing, finishing her last realistic novels and collections of short stories. She also entered the public debate on topical themes: women's emancipation and other ethical and moral issues. She had considerable polemical gifts, and was critical of emancipation as it was developing, and of the moral and ethical decline she felt was threatening in the wake of the First World War.

In 1919, she moved to Lillehammer, a small town in the Gudbrand Valley in southeast Norway, taking her two children with her. She was then expecting her third child. The intention was that she should take a rest at Lillehammer and move back to Kristiania as soon as Svarstad had their new house in order. However, the marriage broke down and a divorce followed. In August 1919, she gave birth to her third child, at Lillehammer. She decided to make Lillehammer her home, and within two years, Bjerkebæk, a large house of traditional Norwegian timber architecture, was completed, along with a large fenced garden with views of the town and the villages around. Here she was able to retreat and concentrate on her writing.

Kristin Lavransdatter trilogy and The Master of Hestviken tetralogy
After the birth of her third child, and with a secure roof over her head, Undset started a major project: Kristin Lavransdatter. She was at home in the subject matter, having written a short novel at an earlier stage about a period in Norwegian history closer to the Pre-Christian era. She had also published a Norwegian retelling of the Arthurian legends. She had studied Old Norse manuscripts and Medieval chronicles and visited and examined Medieval churches and monasteries, both at home and abroad. She was now an authority on the period she was portraying and a very different person from the 22-year-old who had written her first novel about the Middle Ages.

It was only after the end of her marriage that Undset wrote her masterpiece. In the years between 1920 and 1927, she first published the three-volume Kristin, and then the 4-volume Olav (Audunssøn), swiftly translated into English as The Master of Hestviken. Simultaneously with this creative process, she was engaged in trying to find meaning in her own life, finding the answer in God.

Undset experimented with modernist tropes such as stream of consciousness in her novel, although the original English translation by Charles Archer excised many of these passages. In 1997, the first volume of Tiina Nunnally's new translation of the work won the PEN/Faulkner Award for Fiction in the category of translation. The names of each volume were translated by Archer as The Bridal Wreath, The Mistress of Husaby, and The Cross, and by Nunnally as The Wreath, The Wife, and The Cross. Subsequent translation of the Hestviken tetralogy by Nunnally are retitled Olav Audunssøn (1):Vows (The Axe), …(2) Providence, (The Snake Pit), …(3) Crossroads (In The Wilderness), and …(4) Winter (The Son Avenger).

Catholicism
Both Undset's parents were atheists and, although, in accord with the norm of the day, she and her two younger sisters were baptised and with their mother regularly attended the local Lutheran church, the milieu in which they were raised was a thoroughly secular one. Undset spent much of her life as an agnostic, but marriage and the outbreak of the First World War were to change her attitudes. During those difficult years she experienced a crisis of faith, almost imperceptible at first, then increasingly strong. The crisis led her from clear agnostic skepticism, by way of painful uneasiness about the ethical decline of the age, towards Christianity.

In all her writing, one senses an observant eye for the mystery of life and for that which cannot be explained by reason or the human intellect. At the back of her sober, almost brutal realism, there is always an inkling of something unanswerable. At any rate, this crisis radically changed her views and ideology. Whereas she had once believed that man created God, she eventually came to believe that God created man.

However, she did not turn to the established Lutheran Church of Norway, where she had been nominally reared. She was received into the Catholic Church in November 1924, after thorough instruction from the Catholic priest in her local parish. She was 42 years old. She subsequently became a lay Dominican.

It is noteworthy that The Master of Hestviken, written immediately after Undset's conversion, takes place in a historical period when Norway was Catholic, that it has very religious themes of the main character's relations with God and his deep feeling of sin, and that the Medieval Catholic Church is presented in a favorable light, with virtually all clergy and monks in the series being positive characters.

In Norway, Undset's conversion to Catholicism was not only considered sensational; it was scandalous. It was also noted abroad, where her name was becoming known through the international success of Kristin Lavransdatter. At the time, there were very few practicing Catholics in Norway, which was an almost exclusively Lutheran country. Anti-Catholicism was widespread not only among the Lutheran clergy, but through large sections of the population. Likewise, there was just as much anti-Catholic scorn among the Norwegian intelligentsia, many of whom were adherents of socialism and communism The attacks against her faith and character were quite vicious at times, with the result that Undset's literary gifts were aroused in response. For many years, she participated in the public debate, going out of her way to defend the Catholic Church. In response, she was swiftly dubbed "The Mistress of Bjerkebæk" and "The Catholic Lady".

Later life
At the end of this creative eruption, Undset entered calmer waters. After 1929, she completed a series of novels set in contemporary Oslo, with a strong Catholic element. She selected her themes from the small Catholic community in Norway. But here also, the main theme is love. She also published a number of weighty historical works which put the history of Norway into a sober perspective. In addition, she translated several Icelandic sagas into Modern Norwegian and published a number of literary essays, mainly on English literature, of which a long essay on the Brontë sisters, and one on D. H. Lawrence, are especially worth mentioning.

In 1934, she published Eleven Years Old, an autobiographical work. With a minimum of camouflage, it tells the story of her own childhood in Kristiania, of her home, rich in intellectual values and love, and of her sick father.

At the end of the 1930s, she commenced work on a new historical novel set in 18th century Scandinavia. Only the first volume, Madame Dorthea, was published, in 1939. The Second World War broke out that same year and proceeded to break her, both as a writer and as a woman. She never completed her new novel. When Joseph Stalin's invasion of Finland touched off the Winter War, Undset supported the Finnish war effort by donating her Nobel Prize on 25 January 1940.

Exile
When Germany invaded Norway in April 1940, Undset was forced to flee. She had strongly criticised Hitler since the early 1930s, and, from an early date, her books were banned in Nazi Germany. She had no wish to become a target of the Gestapo and fled to neutral Sweden. Her eldest son, Second Lieutenant Anders Svarstad of the Norwegian Army, was killed in action at the age of 27, on 27 April 1940, in an engagement with German troops at Segalstad Bridge in Gausdal.

Undset's sick daughter had died shortly before the outbreak of the war. Bjerkebæk was requisitioned by the Wehrmacht, and used as officers' quarters throughout the Occupation of Norway.

In 1940, Undset and her younger son left neutral Sweden for the United States. There, she untiringly pleaded her occupied country's cause and that of Europe's Jews in writings, speeches and interviews. She lived in Brooklyn Heights, New York. She was active in St. Ansgar's Scandinavian Catholic League and wrote several articles for its bulletin. She also traveled to Florida, where she became close friends with novelist Marjorie Kinnan Rawlings.

Following the German execution of the Danish Lutheran pastor Kaj Munk on 4 January 1944, the Danish resistance newspaper De frie Danske printed condemning articles from influential Scandinavians, including Undset.

Return to Norway and death
Undset returned to Norway after the liberation in 1945. She lived another four years but never published another word. Undset died at 67 in Lillehammer, Norway, where she had lived from 1919 through 1940. She was buried in the village of Mesnali, 15 kilometers east of Lillehammer, where also her daughter and the son who died in battle are remembered. The grave is recognizable by three black crosses.

Honors
 Undset won the Nobel prize for literature in 1928, for which she was nominated by Helga Eng, member of the Norwegian Academy of Science and Letters.
 A mountain on the moon, east of crater Lambert at Mare Imbrium, was called Mons Undset, however, it was erroneously mentioned as Mons Undest on Lunar Topographic Orthophotomap 40B4. The International Astronomical Union (IAU) refused to include Mons Undset in the alphabetic gazetteer of officially named lunar formations. This mountain is nowadays known as Lambert γ (Lambert gamma).
 A crater on the planet Venus was named after Undset.
 Undset was depicted on a Norwegian 500 kroner note and a two-kroner postage stamp from 1982. Neighboring Sweden put her on a stamp in 1998.
 Bjerkebæk, Undset's home in Lillehammer, is now part of the Maihaugen museum. The farmhouse was listed in 1983. Efforts to restore and furnish the houses as they were during the time of her occupancy were begun in 1997. New public buildings were opened in May 2007.
 Undset is depicted on the tail fin of a Norwegian Air Shuttle Boeing 737-800, with the registration LN-NGY.

Works

 Gunnar's Daughter is a brief novel set in the Saga Age. This was Undset's first historical novel, published in 1909.
Gunnar's Daughter, 
 The Master of Hestviken series is a tetralogy of four volumes, published 1925–27, which are listed in order below. Depending on the edition, each volume may be printed by itself, or two volumes may be combined into one book. The latter tends to result from older printings and whether the original Norwegian or later English translation. Recent completed or planned re-titling/releases by Tiina Nunnally, from the University of Minnesota Press, are shown below.
The Axe: The Master of Hestviken, re-titled in T. Nunnally's revised English translation as Olav Audunssøn (I): Vows, 
The Snake Pit: The Master of Hestviken, re-titled in T. Nunnally's revised English translation as Olav Audunssøn (II): Providence, 
In the Wilderness: The Master of Hestviken, re-titled in T. Nunnally's revised English translation as Olav Audunssøn (III): Crossroads,  (planned availability 10/2022)
The Son Avenger: The Master of Hestviken, re-titled in T. Nunnally's revised English translation as Olav Audunssøn (IV): Winter (not yet released).
 Kristin Lavransdatter is a trilogy of three volumes. These are listed in order as well. Written during 1920–22. In 1995 the first volume was the basis for a commercial film, Kristin Lavransdatter, directed by Liv Ullmann.
Kristin Lavransdatter: The Wreath. 
Kristin Lavransdatter: The Wife, 
Kristin Lavransdatter: The Cross, 
 Jenny was written in 1911. It is a story of a Norwegian painter who travels to Rome for inspiration. Things do not turn out as she had expected.
Jenny, 
 The Unknown Sigrid Undset, a collection of Undset's early existentialist works, including Tiina Nunnally's new translation of Jenny was assembled by Tim Page for Steerforth Press and published in 2001.
 Men, Women and Places, a collection of critical essays, including 'Blasphemy', 'D. H. Lawrence', 'The Strongest Power', and 'Glastonbury'. Tr. Arthur G Chater, Cassel & Co., London. 1939.
 Happy Times in Norway, a memoir of her children's life in that country before the Nazi occupation, features a particularly moving and powerful preface about the simplicity and hardiness of Norway and its people, with a vow that it will return thus after the evil of Nazism is "swept clean." New York; Alfred A. Knopf. 1942. 
True and Untrue and Other Norse Tales 1945, by Alfred A Knopf. Reissued 2012 by Pook Press;  (hardcover) (based on the original stories collected by Moe and Asbjornsen).
 Saga of Saints, ; . The coming of Christianity.--St. Sunniva and the Seljemen.--St. Olav, Norway's king to all eternity.--St. Hallvard.--St. Magnus, earl of the Orkney islands.--St. Eystein, archbishop of Nidaros.--St. Thorfinn, bishop of Hamar.--Father Karl Schilling, Barnabite. Chapter of this book also published as "A Priest From Norway, The Venerable Karl M. Schilling, CRSP" by the Barnabite Fathers through the North American Voice of Fatima, Youngstown NY, July 1976.
 Ida Elisabeth, novel
Ida Elisabeth (San Francisco: Ignatius Press, 2011), 
 Catherine of Siena, Novel. Sigrid Undset's Catherine of Siena is acclaimed as one of the best biographies of this well known fourteenth-century saint. Undset based this factual work on primary sources, her own experiences living in Italy, and her profound understanding of the human heart. Catherine of Siena was a favorite of Undset, who, like Catherine, was a Third Order Dominican. This novel was republished by Ignatius Press in 2009.
Catherine of Siena (San Francisco: Ignatius Press, 2009), 
 Stages on the Road is a collection of saints' lives, with a foreword by Elizabeth Scalia, and published in 2012.
 The Wild Orchid is a novel set in twentieth century Norway and published in 1931.  The title is in reference to the garden of the main character's mother.
 The Burning Bush is a continuation of the novel The Wild Orchid and published in 1932.  It examines the conflicts arising in the main character's life after his conversion to Catholicism.
 Ida Elizabeth 1933. Cassell and Co.

See also
 List of female Nobel laureates

References

Other sources
 Inside the gate: Sigrid Undset's Life at Bjerkebæk by Nan Bentzen Skille, translated by Tiina Nunnally. 
 
 
 Bayerschmidt, Carl F. 1970. Sigrid Undset. (Twayne's world authors series 107.) New York: Twayne Publishers.
 Nan Bentzen Skille: 2018 Inside the Gate. Sigrid Undset's Life at Bjerkebæk – biography translated by Tiina Nunnally University of Minnesota Press, 
 Undset, Sigrid, and Deal W. Hudson. Sigrid Undset on saints and sinners: new translations and studies; papers presented at a conference sponsored by the Wethersfield Institute, New York City, April 24, 1993. Ignatius Press, 1993.

External links

 Inside the gate.Sigrid Undset's life at Bjerkebæk
 Times Literary Supplement 24. August 2018. " Look to Norway " [3]https://www.the-tls.co.uk/articles/private/sigrid-undset-norway-war/
 Sigrid Undset Bibliography 1907–2007
List of Works
 
 
 www.undset.no/susenglish2.html
 "Jenny" – English translation at manybooks.net
 Family genealogy
 Short online biography by Gidske Anderson
 
 
 
 

Norwegian historical novelists
Women historical novelists
Norwegian women novelists
Writers of historical fiction set in the Middle Ages
Roman Catholic writers
Lay Dominicans
Nobel laureates in Literature
Norwegian Nobel laureates
Women Nobel laureates
Norwegian Roman Catholics
Converts to Roman Catholicism from atheism or agnosticism
20th-century Norwegian novelists
20th-century Norwegian women writers
20th-century Norwegian translators
People from Kalundborg
1882 births
1949 deaths
People from Brooklyn Heights
People from Lillehammer
Christian novelists